Ni Hong (born October 1962) is a Chinese politician who is the current Minister of Housing and Urban-Rural Development, in office since June 2022.

He was a representative of the 19th National Congress of the Chinese Communist Party.

Biography
Ni was born in Anshan, Liaoning, in October 1962. After resuming the national college entrance examination, in 1979, he entered the Harbin Institute of Architectural Engineering (now Harbin Institute of Technology), majoring in industrial and civil buildings. 

He joined the Chinese Communist Party (CCP) in July 1983, on the verge of graduation. After graduating in 1983, he was assigned to the Village and Town Construction Department of the Ministry of Construction.

In April 1996, he became assistant mayor of Hefei, capital of east China's Anhui province, and was elevated to vice mayor in August 1999. He was appointed party branch secretary of Anhui Provincial Department of Construction (later reshuffled as Anhui Provincial Department of Housing and Urban-Rural Development) in December 2002, concurrently serving as director since January 2006.

He was recalled to the Ministry of Housing and Urban-Rural Development and appointed director of Housing Reform and Development Division in December 2010. He moved up the ranks to become vice minister in June 2015 and minister in June 2022.

References

1962 births
Living people
People from Anshan
Harbin Institute of Technology alumni
People's Republic of China politicians from Liaoning
Chinese Communist Party politicians from Liaoning
Ministers of Housing and Urban-Rural Development of the People's Republic of China